Immediate may refer to:

 Immediate Records, a British  record label
 The Immediate, an Irish rock group
 Immediate Media Company, British publishing house
 Immediate Music, library music company 
 Short for immediate value

See also 
 Immediacy (disambiguation)